Lifeways Group is a British social care company founded in 1995, which provides supported living services for adults with learning disabilities, autism, and brain injuries. It also offers tailored holidays, or “respite breaks”, for the people it supports.

The company was bought for £207m in 2012 by Omers, which invests Ontario’s municipal employees’ retirement pot. At that time it had 6,300 staff.

In April 2015 it acquired Autism Care UK which provides supported living, outreach and day services for people with autism in Lincolnshire, Lancashire, Milton Keynes, Northumberland, South Warwickshire and Yorkshire from the Maria Mallaband Care Group.

In May 2015 the company bought its learning disability services group from Care UK.

Lifeways hit controversy in recent years for bad quality of care due to some locations having an inadequate CQC rating, closure of some services by CQC and local councils for abuse and court cases involving staff where they have abused service users in their care. Particularly the case of Jessica Burgess and Lindsey Warham whom subjected a disabled woman to abuse at one of their Autism Care facilities in Northumberland.

References

www.chroniclelive.co.uk/news/north-east-news/care-home-disgrace-mean-pair-16899788.amp

External links
 Company website

Social care in England
Private providers of NHS services